Moodar Koodam is a 2013 Tamil language black comedy film written, produced and directed by Naveen. The film stars the director himself alongside Sendrayan, Kuberan, and Rajaj in lead roles. Oviya, Anupama Kumar, Jayaprakash, Five Star Krishna, and Uday Mahesh play other pivotal roles. The film was produced by director Naveen himself under the "White Shadows Productions" banner with Pandiraj releasing the movie through his Pasanga Productions. The music is by Natarajan Sankaran. This film received positive reviews.

Plot
Naveen (Naveen), Sendrayan (Sendrayan), Kuberan (Kuberan), and Vellaichami aka White (Rajaj) are four men who are trapped in a cycle of poverty. The story begins with a meeting between them in a police station where they are held in connection with a theft case. Disillusioned with society and their place in it, they plan to burgle the mansion of White's treacherous uncle Bhaktavatsalam (Jayaprakash), whom they believe has left town with his family to go on a pilgrimage. Instead, as the four men plan to break into Bhaktavatsalam's residence, they discover that the family is still inside the house. Thereafter, the criminals take Bhaktavatsalam and his entire family hostage. What follows is a bizarre and comical hostage situation. At one point, the home intruders even force their hostages, including Bhaktavatsalam, his wife Mandothari (Anupama Kumar), and his grown daughter, Karpagavalli (Oviya) to stand upside down on their heads. Soon, a variety of characters congregate to the house, and the four bandits get involved in a quagmire involving moneylenders, enforcers and the mafia.

Cast

 Naveen as Naveen
 Sendrayan as Sendrayan
 Kuberan as Kuberan
 Rajaj as Vellaichami (White)
 Oviya as Karpagavalli "Kapuli"
 Jayaprakash as Bhaktavatsalam, Mayor of Kanchipuram 
 Anupama Kumar as Mandothari
 Uday Mahesh as Salim Bhai
 Five Star Krishna as Naaikaran
 Sindhu Naveen as Farzana
 Baskar as Thakali
 Sanjeevee as Auto Kumar
 Sabeesh as Sabeesh
 Manasa as Subiksha
 Winco Prakash as Kilavar
 Bobby Tejay as Miles
 Aadhira as Veetu Velaikkarar
 Raja Rishi as Vakka

Soundtrack

Music was composed by newcomer Natarajan Sankaran. Behindwoods wrote: "Offers difference but short of variety".

 "ABCD Ungappan" - Sricharan, Raginisri, Naveen
 "Achamillai" - S. P. B. Charan
 "Autokumar" - Natarajan Sankaran
 "Idhu Nalla Naai" - Naveen
 "Kannodu Kangal" - Srinivas
 "Moodar Koodam Theme"
 "Neeyum Bommai" - K. J. Yesudas
 "Nila Odi Va" - Subhiksha Rich Ray
 "Oru Oorula" - S. P. B. Charan
 "Vela Vetti" - Naresh Iyer

Release
The satellite rights of the film were sold to STAR Vijay.

Critical reception
Though the movie was not much advertised, it gained highly positive reviews from the viewers.
Aananda Vikatan, the most popular Tamil magazine, has given a highly positive feedback (50/100). Many things like cast, dialogue etc. were highly appreciated. The review also quoted that black-humour is very rare in Tamil cinema and the director was appreciated specially for his attempt.
Times of India wrote: " With snappy visuals, hyper-kinetic editing, this is a dark comedy influenced by world cinema while still being rooted to local values".
Rediff wrote: "Comedy and satire are beautifully interwoven in Moodar Koodam with excellent support from all the cast. The only negative in the film is the number of characters and incidents incorporated into the film, creating an overdose of everything".
Behindwoods wrote: "As a director, Naveen is able to extract what he wants for his story barring some of the hostage sequences that feel like stage dramas. The film has its best moments when the action moves outside the house, like the several back-stories and the North Chennai episodes".
Baradwaj Rangan writing for The Hindu: "A genuinely scripted comedy, there are moments that are genuinely funny. His next film will be awaited with much interest."

Accolades
The film won the Best Dialogues award at the 8th Vijay Awards and was nominated in two other categories: Best Debut Director and Best Screenplay.

References

External links
 

2013 films
Indian black comedy films
2010s Tamil-language films
Indian remakes of South Korean films
2013 directorial debut films